is a railway station in the town of Mori, Shizuoka Prefecture, Japan, operated by the third sector Tenryū Hamanako Railroad.

Lines
Tōtōmi-Ichinomiya Station is served by the Tenryū Hamanako Line, and is located 16.4 kilometers from the starting point of the line at Kakegawa Station.

Station layout
The station has two opposing side platforms, connected to an old wooden station building by a level crossing. The station is staffed. The station building, which was built in 1940, was designated a Registered Tangible Cultural Property in 2011.

Adjacent stations

History
Tōtōmi-Ichinomiya Station opened on June 1, 1940, when the section of the Japanese National Railways (JNR) Futamata Line was extended from Enshū-Mori Station to Kanasashi Station. . After the privatization of JNR on March 15, 1987, the station came under the control of the Tenryū Hamanako Line.

Passenger statistics
In fiscal 2016, the station was used by an average of 54 passengers daily (boarding passengers only).

Surrounding area
 Oguni Jinja

See also
 List of Railway Stations in Japan

References

External links

  Tenryū Hamanako Railroad Station information 
 

Railway stations in Shizuoka Prefecture
Railway stations in Japan opened in 1940
Stations of Tenryū Hamanako Railroad
Mori, Shizuoka